Park Eunsik (September 30, 1859 - November 1, 1925) was a Korean historian and the second President of the Provisional Government of the Republic of Korea in Shanghai during part of 1925. Soon after the impeachment of Syngman Rhee from the presidency, Park was elected the president, but he soon died from illness while in office. Park was succeeded by Yi Sang-ryong as the president.

Bibliography
Neo-Confucianism Reformation Argument (Yugyo gusinnon; .

References

Korean politicians
1859 births
1925 deaths
Korean independence activists